Hartforth is a small village in the Richmondshire district of North Yorkshire, England. The population was 558 at the 2021 census.

Hartforth Hall 
Hartforth Hall is a Grade II* listed country house. It was built in 1744 for William Cradock of Gilling, who had bought the manor of Hartforth in 1720. Additions were made in 1792 and c. 1900. Rear Admiral Christopher Cradock, who died at the Battle of Coronel, was born at Hartforth in 1862. The property was operated as a hotel and wedding venue from 1986 to 2017, but the hotel is now permanently closed.

References

External links

"Whashton, Kirby Hill, Ravensworth, Gilling, Hartforth Census Data and Information", Whashton.net. Retrieved 6 December 2013

Villages in North Yorkshire